Bulgarophiles (Serbian and Macedonian бугарофили or бугараши ;) is a term used for Slavic people from the regions of Macedonia and Pomoravlje who are ethnic Bulgarians. In Bulgaria, the term Bulgaromans; refers to non-Slavic people such as Aromanians with a Bulgarian self-awareness. In the 20th century, Bulgarophiles in neighboring Yugoslavia and Greece were considered enemies of the state harboring irredentist tendencies.

See also
 Serbomans
 Grecomans
 Macedonian Bulgarians
 Bulgarians in Serbia

References

Macedonian Bulgarians
Anti-Bulgarian sentiment
Pejorative terms for European people